The 2014 GAA Interprovincial Championships was a senior GAA competition in which all 4 provinces of Ireland competed in football and hurling tournaments. The provincial squads are made up of players from county panels in each respective province.

On Sunday 23 February, Connacht defeated Ulster 2-19 to 1-07 in what was their first football Interprovincial Championship title in 45 years.

On Saturday 1 March, Leinster defeated Connacht 1-23 to 0-16 in what was their 29th overall Hurling Interprovincial Championship title.

Football championship

Fixtures

Semi-finals

Final

Hurling championship

Fixtures

Semi-finals

Final

References
 Results and fixtures

GAA Interprovincial Championship
I
I
GAA